The Lycée français Chateaubriand is a French international primary and secondary school with two campuses consisting of three buildings in Rome, Italy. Its administration and senior high school/sixth-form college classes are located in the historic Villa de Via Patrizi building, while other classes are held at a former Christian private school and at the Villa Strohl-Fern.

The Istituto Statale Italiano Leonardo Da Vinci, the Italian school of Paris, is considered to be its sister school. This was established by the Convention Culturelle italo francese of November 4, 1949.

History 
The Lycée français Chateaubriand opened on 3 November 1903 after St-Louis-des-Français Church choirmaster Charles Dumaz and the French Embassy in the Vatican campaigned for the opening of a school for French students. The school, initially housed in an apartment building at Via Sistina, 20, initially was unable to have Italian national students as the Italian government did not allow them to attend international schools; its initial enrollment was 10 students of other nationalities, with three each from France and Switzerland and two each from Romania and the United States.

It moved to Via della Scrofa, 115, another apartment building, in 1907, and by World War I it had about 50 students. For a period it occupied Palazzo Ricci Paracciani for a three-month period and moved into the Villa de Via Patrizi in October 1920. The school temporarily closed during World War II. In 1958 the school began assigning increasing year levels to a new campus at Villa Strohl-Fern; the school wanted to move all grade levels there, but this was not possible due to issues with the government of the City of Rome. In 1980 the school purchased a building that formerly held an Augustinian private school.

Curriculum
The school uses the French educational system with French as the primary medium of instruction. The school has Italian language classes to an advanced level. It does not have a bilingual programme.

Campuses
There are two campuses in Rome. The Patrizi/Malpighi campus serves high school grades and the final year of junior high school (3 ème through terminale).  this campus houses about 500 students. The school began renting space in the Via Patrizi in October 1920 and purchased the building in 1921. The school acquired the Augustinian school building in 1980.

This campus has a large garden.  about 1,000 students attend school at Strohl Fern.

The École française Alexandre Dumas in Naples is administered through Lycée français Chateaubriand.

Student body 
 the school has about 1,500 students, with about 40% being solely Italian citizens, 20% being dual Italian and French citizens, 20% being solely French citizens, and 20% from other countries.

Chateaubrianais

The use of a pidgin called «chateaubrianais» has developed among Italian and French-speaking pupils, made up of Frenchised Italian words and vice versa.

Notable alumni 

 Chiara Mastroianni, actress.
 Cristina Comencini and Francesca Comencini, filmmakers.
 Marzio Perrelli, CEO at HSBC Italy.
 Alberto Angela, writer, film maker and icon.
 Zerocalcare, cartoonist.

See also
 Istituto Statale Italiano Leonardo Da Vinci - The Italian school in Paris

References

External links 
 Official Website 
 http://www.ambafrance-it.org/spip.php?article750

Educational institutions established in 1903
Rome
Secondary schools in Italy
International schools in Rome
Private schools in Italy
1903 establishments in Italy
Rome Q. III Pinciano
Rome Q. V Nomentano